Menace from the Moon is a 1925 science fiction novel by English writer Bohun Lynch, part of an "early twentieth-century flood of lunar fantasies" inaugurated by H.G. Wells' The First Men in the Moon (1901).

Synopsis

Inhabitants of the Moondescendants of "a Dutchman, an Englishman, and an Italian" who in 1654 "with their women rose to the moon by the help of an admirable machine"find themselves threatened with extinction.
Having lost the secrets of "the engine which brought our forefathers hither",
they issue distress signals in the form of optical projections, onto the mists of Dartmoor, of the universal "Real Character" expounded by 17th-century bishop and polymath John Wilkins in his An Essay towards a Real Character, and a Philosophical Language (1668).

Unfortunately the earthlings, not having adopted the Wilkins plan themselves, have difficulty apprehending the import of these spectral presentments (mistaking them at first for "Siamese writing") and even once they do they lack the technology with which to respond.  With time running out and their survival at stake, the impatient and irritable Moon-men determine to command the attention of their terrestrial cousins in a more compelling way, deploying a devastating heat-ray capable of boiling the oceans: "Hasten, hasten: help us to escape. Otherwise the whole earth will be burned dry and eaten up... Answer us, fools!"

After a demonstration of this apparatus so unnerves visitors to an Italian resort that they are unable to enjoy their lunch, a frenzied search for plans to the 17th-century Moon-ship ends in frustration, a short scrap of Wilkinsese being all that is found once the plans' hiding place is discovered.

An anticlimax is reached when, just as the destruction of humanity seems inevitable, it is realized that these menacing messages had in fact been dispatched months earlieran obscure phenomenon had delayed their transitand that in the interim the Moon's infuriated denizens had inadvertently destroyed themselves through misfire of the very weapon with which they had sought to take revenge on what they believed to be an uncaring Earth.
Explains Professor Lancelot Downey, the story's scientific protagonist: "I conceive the Moonfolk to be in the position of a native who, having learnt to fire a gun without knowing much about it, puts in three times the normal charge to produce a particularly deadly effect, and blows himself to pieces."

Reception
One modern commentary has described the book as presenting "World peril, partly in the mode of a house party mystery story, partly in the manner of the early H. G. Wells ... Ingenious, literate, but somewhat clumsily handled."
Another observed, "In the British tradition of novels where humanity is threatened, much of the action occurs in rural areas, the narrator is much more an observer than an active player in events, and technical issueshow 17th-century scientists managed to get to the moonare simply ignored."

Acknowledgement
An author's note expresses indebtedness to "my friend Professor E.N. daC. Andrade for the historical and scientific machinery of this story."

References

Additional sources

1925 British novels
1925 science fiction novels
British science fiction novels
Novels set on the Moon
Jarrold Publishing books